Live in Buffalo: July 4th, 2004 is a live album by the American rock band Goo Goo Dolls. It includes a CD and a DVD, showing their concert in Buffalo, New York from July 4, 2004. The concert included performances of all their major hits, including "Iris", "Name", and "Slide". There are nineteen (19) songs on the DVD total, plus a studio version of their Supertramp cover, "Give A Little Bit" on the CD. The concert was shot and recorded in downtown Buffalo on Niagara Square in front of Buffalo City Hall. As for the concert itself, the performance was enigmatic; garnering comparisons to the Talking Heads' Stop Making Sense from members of the band's crew. Over 60,000 fans attended the performance, braving a torrential downpour. The rain cleared in time for the Goo Goo Dolls to start the show, but during their performance of "January Friend", the rain began pouring down again, harder than before. The band played on, finishing the set, despite being pulled off stage briefly for a safety precaution and skipping three songs* that were on the original set list.

The music video for "Give a Little Bit", which consists of footage from the concert and documentary, was edited by Scott C. Wilson.

Track listing 
All songs written by Johnny Rzeznik except when noted.

Personnel
Goo Goo Dolls
 Johnny Rzeznik – lead vocals, lead guitar, acoustic guitar
 Robby Takac – bass guitar, backing vocals, lead vocals on tracks 6, 7, 13 
 Mike Malinin – drums, percussion

Additional personnel
 Jason Freese – keyboards, accordion, saxophone, backing vocals 
 Greg Suran – rhythm guitar, mandolin, percussion, backing vocals, lead guitar on tracks 5, 7 and 19

Songs omitted due to rain delay
 "We Are the Normal"
 "Burnin' Up"
 "All Eyes On Me"

Charts

Certifications

References

Goo Goo Dolls video albums
2004 live albums
Warner Records live albums
2004 video albums
Live video albums
Warner Records video albums
Goo Goo Dolls live albums